The Rokospol Via is a Czech ultralight and light-sport aircraft (LSA), designed and produced by Rokospol Aviation of Prague, introduced at the Prague airshow in 2008. The aircraft is supplied complete and ready-to-fly.

Design and development
The Via was designed to comply with the Fédération Aéronautique Internationale microlight rules and US light-sport aircraft rules. It features a cantilever low-wing, an enclosed cockpit with two-seats-in-side-by-side configuration under a bubble canopy, fixed tricycle landing gear and a single engine in tractor configuration.

The aircraft is made from sheet aluminum. Its  span wing employs a MS 316 airfoil at the wing root, transitioning to an MS 313 at the wing tip. Standard engines available are the  Rotax 912UL, the  Rotax 912ULS, the turbocharged  Rotax 914,  Continental O-200 and the  ULPower UL350i four-stroke powerplants.

As of March 2017, the design does not appear on the Federal Aviation Administration's list of approved special light-sport aircraft.

Operational history
Reviewer Marino Boric described the design in a 2015 review saying, "the fuselage lines are very smooth and the aircraft looks elegant like a composite made aircraft."

Variants
Via UL
Model for the European microlight category with smaller wings and a gross weight of 
Via LSA
Model for the LSA category with larger wings and a gross weight of

Specifications (Via UL)

References

External links

Via
2000s Czech ultralight aircraft
Light-sport aircraft
Single-engined tractor aircraft